The first Board of Park Commissioners in Charleston, South Carolina, United States, was formed in 1895. The City of Charleston's Grounds Maintenance Division takes care of public green spaces. The Charleston Parks Conservancy is a non-profit working to renovate and improve the city's parks. The Charleston Horticultural Society is active in promoting the quality of the city's gardens.

List of parks

 Allan Park (Charleston)
 Bees Landing Recreation Center
 Brittlebank Park
 Cannon Park (Charleston, SC)
 Charles Towne Landing
 Chapel St. Fountain Park
 Colonial Lake (Charleston, SC)
 Concord Park (Charleston)
 Corrine Jones Playground
 Demetre Park
 Elliotborough Park and Community Garden
 Etiwan Park
 Hampstead Mall
 Hampton Park (Charleston)
 Harmon Park
 Hazel Parker Playground
 Logan St. Triangle Park
 Lenevar Park
 Marion Square
 Martin Park
 Mary Utsey Park
 Mcmahon playground
 Mitchell Playground
 Moultrie Playground
 Northbridge Park
 Parkshore Park
 St. Julian Devine Community Center
 The Battery (Charleston)
 Tiedemann Park and Nature Center
 Theodora Park
 Vivian Anderson Moultrie Playground
 Washington Square (Charleston)
 Waterfront Park (Charleston)
 West Ashley Park
 White Point Garden

References

Charleston, South Carolina
Charleston, South Carolina